Robert Ray Courtney (born September 15, 1952) is an American former pharmacist from Kansas City, Missouri. In 2002, after initially being caught diluting several doses of chemotherapy drugs, he pleaded guilty to intentionally diluting 98,000 prescriptions involving multiple types of drugs, which were given to 4,200 patients, and was sentenced to 30 years in federal prison.

Early life and education 
Courtney was born in Hays, Kansas. His father was a traveling minister based in Scott City, and described Courtney as an "ideal son". He played the trombone at Wichita South High School. 
Courtney graduated from the School of Pharmacy at University of Missouri–Kansas City in 1975.

Adult life 
In 1986, Courtney became the owner of Research Medical Tower Pharmacy in Kansas City, where he had worked for some time. He primarily mixed intravenous drugs. Before his arrest, Courtney served as a deacon at Northland Cathedral, an Assemblies of God megachurch in Kansas City.

In 1992, he and his first wife divorced; Courtney retained custody of their two daughters. His second marriage lasted four or five days and was later annulled. In 1994 his third wife, Laura Courtney, gave birth to twins. 
In August 2001, the same month he was arrested, Courtney held total assets worth $18.7 million.

Dilution fraud 
In 1990, Courtney began purchasing pharmaceuticals on the gray market and using them to fill prescriptions at his pharmacy. In time he began diluting prescriptions to increase profits. Both practices were illegal.

In 1998, Eli Lilly sales representative Darryl Ashley noticed Courtney was selling three times the amount that he'd bought of the cancer drug Gemzar. Eli Lilly initiated an internal investigation but found no evidence of illegality and closed the investigation without further action.

In early 2001, several nurses in the office of Dr. Verda Hunter (now Hicks), an oncologist in Courtney's building, noticed that several of Hunter's patients weren't experiencing the debilitating side effects that are normally the case with chemotherapy regimens. They voiced their concerns to Ashley, who wondered if Hunter's patients were actually getting the full prescribed dose. When he reviewed the utilization records, he discovered the same problem that he'd seen in 1998; Courtney appeared to be selling Gemzar for $20 per vial less than what the drug was worth at the market, appearing to take a substantial loss. Combined with the lack of side effects, it led Ashley to suspect that Courtney might be diluting the drugs. Ashley said years later that if he was right, Courtney was committing "a hideous crime".

Hunter also noticed that many of her patients were only suffering mild side effects, and their condition didn't seem to be improving.  Hunter had medication that had been supplied by Courtney tested. The results showed that the sample contained less than one-third of the drug prescribed. Upon receiving the test results back, Hunter immediately cut ties with Courtney and notified the FBI.

Investigators with the FBI and FDA initially didn't believe that a pharmacist would do something so egregious; pharmacists have long been among the most trusted professionals in the country and the world. They initially hoped there was an innocent explanation. However, when Hunter showed them the test results, they realized that she was telling the truth. Hunter submitted seven additional samples for testing by the FDA's forensic chemistry lab. Tests on those samples revealed that they only contained a fraction of the prescribed dosage–as little as 15 percent, and at most 39 percent. They immediately knew that they had to move quickly. While health care fraud cases normally take years to build, the investigators knew they didn't have that long. They spared no expense to stop Courtney, considering it a matter of public safety.

Investigators believed that Courtney took a base dose of chemotherapy drugs and split it between three prescriptions, then sold them to oncologists for the same price as a full dose. He took advantage of the fact that oncologists are usually concerned mainly with chemotherapy's effects on the body, not the amount of the dose. While he was supposed to prepare infusions with $3,000 worth of chemotherapy drugs, the solutions he prepared were equivalent to only $700, turning a significant profit.

Even with damning evidence that Courtney was diluting drugs, federal prosecutors asked the FBI and FDA to establish a chain of custody in order to get probable cause for an arrest. Prosecutors believed that since there were other pharmacists in the building, they needed to tie any diluted drugs directly to Courtney and show he was the only one who was diluting drugs. With this in mind, investigators persuaded Hunter to help them in a sting operation. Hunter gave Courtney several prescriptions for fictitious patients. Courtney mixed the drugs, initialed the infusion bags, and personally took them to Hunter's office. Federal agents had them tested at the FDA lab. The samples contained less than 30 percent of the prescribed dosage, and in some cases contained no detectable chemotherapy at all. Agents believed that giving patients infusions with no active drugs was no different than giving them saline solution.

On August 13, 2001, federal agents raided Research Medical Tower Pharmacy. They told Courtney that they were investigating a pharmacist, and needed to get information about who prepared the chemo infusions for Hunter's patients. Courtney acknowledged he'd prepared them–and thus unwittingly confessed to diluting drugs. On August 14, federal agents told Courtney that he was the target of the investigation, and shut his pharmacy down. On August 15, Courtney surrendered to authorities and was charged with one count of adulterating and misbranding drugs. Investigators reported that before turning himself in, Courtney gave $80,000 in cash, and more than 100 doses of Prozac to his wife.

The news of Courtney's arrest sent the Kansas City area into a panic. The FBI urged anyone who had ever received chemotherapy infusions from Courtney to come forward.

Faced with the mounting evidence, Courtney gave investigators a list of three medications that he diluted, and a list of 34 affected patients. He claimed to have only started diluting drugs a few months ago, a claim no one believed. He openly admitted he did it to pay off a $1 million donation to the Northland Cathedral building fund. On August 23, 2001, Courtney was indicted on 20 counts of tampering with consumer products and adulterating and misbranding drugs. Many patients and survivors wanted him charged with murder, as did federal investigators. While the FBI and FDA believed he was essentially a serial killer, federal prosecutors believed a murder charge would be hard to prove since many patients were suffering from late-stage cancer. Additionally, oncology experts told the FBI that there was no way to prove beyond reasonable doubt that the diluted chemotherapy directly contributed to patients dying.

Courtney also was named as a defendant in approximately 300 suits for fraud and wrongful death. In one case a jury awarded the plaintiff, Georgia Hayes, a total of $2.2 billion in damages. Although Hayes knew she would likely never see that money because his assets had been frozen, she wanted to send a message that this type of deceit was not worth the cost.

Eli Lilly and Bristol Myers-Squibb were named in several of the civil suits. Eli Lilly ultimately settled the suits for $48 million, while Bristol Myers-Squibb paid $24 million.

Facing the prospect of life in prison if convicted at trial, on February 20, 2002, Courtney pleaded guilty to 20 federal counts of tampering and adulterating the chemotherapy drugs Taxol and Gemzar. He also acknowledged that he and his corporation, Courtney Pharmacy Inc., had weakened drugs, conspired to traffic in stolen drugs and caused the filing of false Medicare claims. Prosecutors sought a plea deal because they believed it was the only way to get to the bottom of his scheme. According to law enforcement estimates, as well as his own confession, from 1992 to 2001 Courtney diluted 98,000 prescriptions from 400 doctors, which were given to 4,200 patients. Courtney admitted to diluting 72 different kinds of drugs. Besides chemotherapy treatments, he admitted diluting medications for diabetes and AIDS patients, as well as fertility treatments. He subsequently admitted that he had been diluting drugs for his entire career–as he put it, "whatever I could dilute, I did dilute". Over the course of his career, he earned over $19 million, a figure that FBI agent Melissa Osborne called "blood money". On December 5, 2002, Courtney was sentenced to 30 years in federal prison.

In 2008, an episode of American Greed entitled "Deadly Rx For Greed", recounted Courtney's crimes, trial and conviction. In 2020, an episode of Oxygen's License to Kill, entitled "Deadly Pharmacist," chronicled Courtney's misdeeds.

Courtney, Federal Bureau of Prisons inmate number 14536-045, started his sentence at Gilmer Federal Correctional Institution near Glenville, West Virginia before being transferred to Englewood Federal Correctional Institution near Littleton, Colorado. His earliest possible release date is on November 20, 2027, when he will be 75 years old.

In July 2020, Courtney was considered for release seven years early due to the COVID-19 pandemic; he would have served the remainder of his sentence on house arrest in Trimble, Missouri. In his request for early release, Courtney cited numerous health issues, such as a stroke and hypertension. However, amid community and bipartisan outcry, federal judge Ortrie D. Smith turned the request down on September 1, 2020, saying that Courtney's crimes were "vastly different" than was normally the case for defendants seeking compassionate release.

The Law & Order: Criminal Intent second season episode from November 2002, Malignant, is a fictional story based in great part on the above events.

See also 
 Counterfeit medications

References 

Eli Lilly and Company people
American pharmacists
People from Hays, Kansas
1952 births
Living people
University of Missouri–Kansas City alumni
American people convicted of fraud